Tupuola Seua’i Ato Leau Plodzicki-Faoagali (born 18 February 1999) is a Samoan amateur boxer who has represented Samoa at the Pacific Games, Commonwealth Games and the 2020 Summer Olympics.

Amateur career 
He competed at the 2019 Pacific Games, where he won gold in the light heavyweight division. The Covid-19 pandemic meant that he was not able to compete in any international tournaments in the leadup to the 2020 Olympics, but was able to train in Australia alongside fello samoan boxer Marion Ah Tong. At the Olympics he was defeated by Belarusian Uladzislau Smiahlikau in his first fight. Following the 2020 Olympics he focused on selection for the 2022 Commonwealth Games in Birmingham. On 14 July 2022 he was selected as part of Samoa's team for the games. He reached the final in the heavyweight competition but was defeated by Lewis Williams and was awarded the silver medal.

Professional boxing career 
Plodzicki-Faoagali made his professional boxing debut on the 25th of November 2022 at Faleata Sports Complex in Apia, Samoa. Marion Faustino Ah Tong was also making his professional debut as the main undercard. Plodzicki-Faoagali took on Fijian boxer Apisai Naciqa. Plodzicki-Faoagali won the fight by TKO.

Professional boxing record

Personal life 
Plodzicki-Faoagali is born in Sydney, Australia. He holds two matai titles: Tupuola from Sa’aga, Siumu and Seua’i from Tuana'i.

References

External links
 

1999 births
Living people
Samoan male boxers
Commonwealth Games medallists in boxing
Commonwealth Games silver medallists for Samoa
Boxers at the 2018 Commonwealth Games
Boxers at the 2022 Commonwealth Games
Light-heavyweight boxers
Heavyweight boxers
Boxers at the 2020 Summer Olympics
Olympic boxers of Samoa
Medallists at the 2018 Commonwealth Games
Medallists at the 2022 Commonwealth Games